Ultimate Air Shuttle is an airline based in Cincinnati, Ohio. It is the operating name of Ultimate Jetcharters LLC, an FAR Part 135 air charter carrier. Ultimate Air Shuttle previously operated public charter flights on a published schedule, serving key business routes from Cincinnati Municipal Lunken Airport that were reduced by Delta Air Lines and Comair. The airline suspended operations from late 2020 to mid 2021 and again from December 16, 2021, due to the impact of the COVID-19 pandemic on business travel.

History

Ultimate Air Shuttle started operations in 2009 shortly after the merger of Delta Air Lines and Northwest Airlines in an attempt to serve destinations on a time driven basis. The airline launched with flights to New York and soon expanded to Chicago in 2010. In 2012, Detroit and Washington, D.C., were added as destinations, but the Detroit route was discontinued later that year and the Washington, D.C., route was switched to Charlotte in 2013.

On May 12, 2015, Ultimate Air Shuttle announced that it would start flying seasonal service to Nantucket and Martha's Vineyard, Massachusetts; Westhampton Beach, New York; and from Morristown, New Jersey. After a few months of service, the Westhampton Beach destination was cancelled due to a lack of demand. The airline has expressed interest in future markets, such as Indianapolis, Memphis, and Nashville; however, they have yet to actually start. In October 2015, Ultimate began service to Cleveland, while additionally announcing that it would add flights to Chicago Executive Airport beginning in 2016. Also, flights to DeKalb-Peachtree Airport (Atlanta) and Nashville International Airport were indicated as the next cities with service to be added in the coming year. In May 2016, Ultimate Air Shuttle announced it would move its CVG flights to LUK in order to add an extra daily flight to Chicago-MDW and New York-MMU; however, planned flights to TEB have been delayed.

In January 2017, Ultimate Air Shuttle announced that it plans to launch flights from Lunken to DeKalb-Peachtree Airport (Atlanta).

Parent company Ultimate Jetcharters formerly operated flights for OneJet until that company suspended operations in August 2018; OneJet had attempted to acquire Ultimate Jetcharters and Ultimate Air Shuttle, but the deal fell through and Ultimate terminated the flights. Ultimate Jetcharters later operated flights for Taos Air in the winter of 2018–2019, but Taos Air changed operators for the 2019–2020 winter season. 

In mid 2020, Ultimate Air Shuttle suspended scheduled service due to travel restrictions resulting from the COVID-19 pandemic. Service was briefly resumed in the summer, but was suspended again from September until an unspecified date in early 2021 because business travel had not recovered adequately. Operations were restored in the second half of 2021, but the airline announced it would suspend flights again from December 16 into 2022 due to the continuing effects that the pandemic had on business travel.

In late 2022, Ultimate Jetcharters was subcontracted to fly 48 migrants from Florida to Martha's Vineyard, a sanctuary city where the migrants were told work was waiting for them. But, upon arrival, no jobs were available.

Destinations
Ultimate Air Shuttle suspended all travel on December 16, 2021, due to the continued effects of the COVID-19 pandemic and restrictions on business travel. In September 2022, they began offering private shuttle service to Martha's Vineyard to pre-qualified refugees.  

Until then, Ultimate Air Shuttle provided service to the following locations:
 Former destinations

Fleet
The Ultimate Air Shuttle fleet:

See also
 Martha's Vineyard migrant crisis

References

External links
 

Airlines based in Ohio
Charter airlines of the United States
Airlines established in 2009
2009 establishments in Ohio
Companies based in Cincinnati
American companies established in 2009